Zhandos Ismailov (born 29 December 1994) is a Kazakh freestyle wrestler. He won the silver medal in the men's 57 kg event at the 2017 Islamic Solidarity Games held in Baku, Azerbaijan.

Career 

In 2018, he won one of the bronze medals in the 57 kg event at the Asian Wrestling Championships held in Bishkek, Kyrgyzstan.

In 2018, he also represented Kazakhstan at the Asian Games in Jakarta, Indonesia in the men's freestyle 57 kg event. In this competition, he won his first match against Hamidullah Abdullah of Afghanistan and he was eliminated from the competition in his next match against Kang Kum-song of North Korea.

Achievements

References

External links 
 

Living people
1994 births
Place of birth missing (living people)
Kazakhstani male sport wrestlers
Wrestlers at the 2018 Asian Games
Asian Games competitors for Kazakhstan
Islamic Solidarity Games medalists in wrestling
Islamic Solidarity Games competitors for Kazakhstan
Asian Wrestling Championships medalists
21st-century Kazakhstani people